New in Town is a 2009 film.

New in Town may also refer to:

 "New in Town" (song), a 2009 single by Little Boots
 New in Town (video game), a 2012 social network game by Digital Chocolate
 New in Town, a stand-up comedy special by John Mulaney